Tom Hartley may refer to:
 Tom Hartley (politician)
 Tom Hartley (cricketer)

See also
 Thomas Hartley, American lawyer, soldier, and politician